Arresting Power: Resisting Police Violence in Portland, Oregon is a 2015 award-winning documentary film co-directed by Jodi Darby, Julie Perini, and Erin Yanke.

Synopsis
The film showcases the development of conflict between local residents of Portland, Oregon and the law enforcement agencies during the last half century. It also features interviews of victims of police brutality and those by family members of people killed during police action. Interviews by members of Portland's abolition movement have also been included in the documentary. The film uses archival newsreel footage from the Oregon Historical Society along with scenes shot at the locations of police brutalities and tries to showcase a world without the current institution of the police.

The Portland Institute for Contemporary Art partly funded the documentary through the Andy Warhol Regional Re-grant Program which gave the film its 2013 Precipice Fund Project Grant. Supporters of the film made up the rest with donations.

The film has screened at the Northwest Film Center, the Hollywood Theatre (Portland, Oregon), the Clinton Street Theater, the Capitol Theater (Olympia), the Harlem International Film Festival and many other theaters, festivals, art spaces, community spaces around the United States and around the world.

Awards

 John Michaels Award for Social Justice Films, Second Place, Big Muddy Film Festival, Carbondale, Illinois 2015
 Documentary Category, Best of the Northwest Award of Excellence, 2015
 Making a Difference Category, Best of the Northwest Award of Excellence, 2015

References

Further reading
"Don't Shoot: A New Documentary Examines the History of Police Brutality in Portland" Willamette Week, by Rebecca Jacobson, January 14, 2015

External links
 
 
 "Arresting Power" at Collective Eye Films

Films set in Portland, Oregon
2015 documentary films
American documentary films
Law enforcement in Oregon
Documentary films about Oregon
Documentary films about law enforcement in the United States
2010s English-language films
2010s American films